Big Rous Holt is a small woodland beside the B1191 (Horncastle Road) to the north east of the village of Woodhall Spa in Lincolnshire on Roughton Moor. To its south west is Little Rous Holt, and bordering it to the north east is Roughton Scrubs.

Forests and woodlands of Lincolnshire